Elaine Dagg-Jackson (born May 23, 1955 in Vancouver, British Columbia, Canada as Elaine Dagg) is a Canadian curler and curling coach from Victoria, British Columbia.

She won a bronze medal at the 1992 Winter Olympics when curling was a demonstration sport.

Personal life
Dagg-Jackson grew up in Kelowna. Her father is Lyall Dagg, winner of the 1964 Macdonald Brier. She moved to Victoria in 1986, and began curling competitively thereafter. Before her coaching career, she worked for Copeland Communications. She is married to curler and coach Glen Jackson.

Awards
Joan Mead Builder Award:  ("Canadian Curling Association National Team Coach")
British Columbia Curling Hall of Fame: 1996, together with all of the Julie Sutton 1991–1993 team.
British Columbia Sports Hall of Fame: 1996, together with all of the 1987 Pat Sanders Rink.
Greater Victoria Sports Hall of Fame: 2015

Teams and events

Record as a coach of national teams

References

External links

 
 
 
 Elaine Dagg-Jackson – Curling Canada Stats Archive
 Elaine Dagg-Jackson | Curling Canada
 Elaine Dagg-Jackson | Coaching Association of Canada
 Faculty & Coaches – Greater Victoria Curling Academy (look at "Elaine Dagg-Jackson, Ch.P.C.")
 Video: 
 Canada's Elaine Dagg-Jackson competing in the curling event at the 1992 Albertville Olympic winter Games. (CP PHOTO/COA/Ted Grant)

Living people
1955 births
Curlers from Vancouver
Curlers from Victoria, British Columbia
Sportspeople from Kelowna
Canadian women curlers
Canadian women's curling champions
Curlers at the 1992 Winter Olympics
Olympic curlers of Canada
Canadian curling coaches
Canadian people of Irish descent
Canadian people of Scottish descent
Canadian people of English descent
Canadian people of Dutch descent